Ernest Douglas "Ernie" Isley  (born June 29, 1937) is a former school principal and provincial and municipal level politician from Alberta, Canada. He served as a member of the Legislative Assembly of Alberta from 1979 to 1993. He is the former mayor for the town of Bonnyville, Alberta, Isley served that post after being acclaimed in a by-election on March 7, 2006, until being defeated by Gene Sobolewski on October 21, 2013.

Early life
Isley served for seven years as Principal for Bonnyville Centralized High School before running for provincial office.

Provincial political career
Isley was elected to the Alberta Legislature in the 1979 Alberta general election. He won the electoral district of Bonnyville defeating four other candidates to hold it for the Progressive Conservatives. He won his second term and a larger plurality facing two other candidates to win the 1982 Alberta general election. His third time running for office in the 1986 Alberta general election, would see him win his third term with a reduced but comfortable plurality. He would again defeat two other candidates, his strongest challenger was New Democrat candidate Thomas Tucker.

Isley would run for a fourth term in office in the 1989 Alberta general election.

He ran for a fifth term in office in the 1993 Alberta general election but was narrowly defeated in a by Liberal candidate Leo Vasseur.

During his term in office, he served in several cabinet portfolios, including Public Works and Agriculture.  He gained criticism in the early 1990s when under his direction, the amalgamation of the towns of Cold Lake and Grand Centre was initiated with CFB Cold Lake-4 Wing.

In 2009, Wildrose Alliance Danielle Smith welcomed Isley into the Wildrose Alliance Party, although he was also a card-carrying member of the Conservative Party. and he has been a key organizer for the Leader and Party in the Bonnyville - Cold Lake constituency.

In September 2010, Isley helped organize a tour for Wildrose Leader Danielle Smith to Bonnyville, Cold Lake, and Glendon.  Isley said in an interview that his goal in life is to do everything possible in the next two years to elect a Wildrose government in the next election, which did not happen.

Municipal career
Isley was acclaimed as the Mayor of Bonnyville, Alberta in a by-election held on March 7, 2006. He was returned by acclamation in the 2007 Bonnyville municipal election.  He would continue to serve as Bonnyville's mayor until 2013, when he ran for a fourth term even though he'd publicly stated he was retiring.  He was soundly defeated by Gene Sobolewski.

References

External links
Legislative Assembly of Alberta Members Listing

Progressive Conservative Association of Alberta MLAs
Living people
1937 births
Members of the Executive Council of Alberta